Oncidium sphacelatum is a species of orchid ranging from Mexico to Central America, southeastern Venezuela. It is known as Kandyan dancer orchid in Sri Lanka due to its resemblance like Kandyan dancer.

References 

sphacelatum
Orchids of Central America
Orchids of Belize
Orchids of Mexico
Orchids of Venezuela